The Professional Footballers' Association Team of the Year (often called the PFA Team of the Year, or simply the Team of the Year) is an annual award given to a set of 55 footballers across the top four tiers of men's English football; the Premier League, the Championship, League One and League Two, as well as the women's FA WSL, who are seen to be deserving of being named in a "Team of the Year". Peter Shilton currently holds the most appearances in the PFA Team of the Year in the top division with 10 appearances. Steven Gerrard currently holds the most appearances in the PFA Team of the Year in the Premier League era with eight appearances.

The award has been presented since the 1973–74 season and the shortlist is compiled by the members of the players' trade union, the Professional Footballers' Association (PFA), in January of every year, with the winners then being voted for by the other players in their respective divisions. The award is regarded by players in the Football League as the highest accolade available to them, due to it being picked by their fellow professionals. Oxford United's Damian Batt, who was named in the Team of the Year for League Two in 2011, said he was "very pleased to be given such a prestigious award. It is something that I am very proud of". In 2014, a team for female players competing in the FA WSL was selected for the first time.

Key
Heading key: Pos. – Position; App. – Number of appearances in a PFA Team of the Year.
Position key: GK – Goalkeeper; DF – Defender; MF – Midfielder; FW – Forward.
Players marked  appeared in a first tier PFA Team of the Year more than once.
Players marked  appeared in a second tier PFA Team of the Year more than once.
Players marked * appeared in a third tier PFA Team of the Year more than once.
Players marked ¤ appeared in a fourth tier PFA Team of the Year more than once.

Winners

1989–90
Source

First Division

Second Division

Third Division

Fourth Division

1990–91
Source

First Division

Second Division

Third Division

Fourth Division

1991–92
Source

First Division

Second Division

Third Division

Fourth Division

1992–93
Source

FA Premier League

First Division

Second Division

Third Division

1993–94
Source

FA Premier League

First Division

Second Division

Third Division

1994–95
Source

FA Premier League

First Division

Second Division

Third Division

1995–96
Source

FA Premier League

First Division

Second Division

Third Division

1996–97
Source

FA Premier League

First Division

Second Division

Third Division

1997–98
Source

FA Premier League

First Division

Second Division

Third Division

1998–99
Source

FA Premier League

First Division

Second Division

Third Division

Notes

See also
PFA Team of the Year (1970s)
PFA Team of the Year (1980s)
PFA Team of the Year (2000s)
PFA Team of the Year (2010s)
PFA Team of the Year (2020s)

References

External links
The official website of the Professional Footballers' Association

1990s
1990s in England
1990s in sports